KWWN (1100 AM) is a radio station licensed to Las Vegas, Nevada, United States. The station is owned by Lotus Communications. Programming includes the UNLV Rebels football and men's basketball teams, the Las Vegas Aces, ESPN Radio talk shows and play-by-play, and various local talk shows. Its studios are located in the unincorporated community of Spring Valley in Clark County and its transmitter is located in North Las Vegas.

Station history
KWWN officially signed on in December 2007, and was running tests of its transmitter for several months. These tests were mainly to arrange the nighttime directional signal of the station, so it would not interfere with nearby KNZZ or other stations on 1100 kHz. While testing, the station ran at half power (10,000 watts day and 1,000 watts night) to further limit the possibility of interference. 1100 AM is a United States clear-channel frequency, on which WTAM in Cleveland, Ohio is the dominant Class A station. KWWN is currently running at its normal power.

Originally, KWWN simulcast sister station KBAD. Sometime in 2008, the simulcast ended; KBAD became the local affiliate of Fox Sports Radio, while KWWN picked up the ESPN Radio affiliation. KENO, which had been the FSR station, joined ESPN Deportes Radio.

KWWN is the flagship station of the Las Vegas Aces of the Women's National Basketball Association. Before the start of the 2018-19 season, the station was named as an affiliate of the Los Angeles Lakers Radio Network as Las Vegas doesn't have a team in the National Basketball Association

References

External links

WWN
Sports radio stations in the United States
Radio stations established in 2007
2007 establishments in Nevada
Lotus Communications stations